Noel Turner (born 9 December 1974) is a Maltese former footballer who played at both professional and international levels as a midfielder.

Career
Born in Sliema, Turner spent his entire professional career with hometown club Sliema Wanderers.

Turner earned 61 caps for Malta, appearing in 14 FIFA World Cup qualifying matches.

See also
 List of one-club men

References

1974 births
Living people
Maltese footballers
Malta international footballers
Association football midfielders
Sliema Wanderers F.C. players